The Hardware River is a  tributary of the James River in central Virginia in the United States.  It is part of the watershed of Chesapeake Bay.

See also
List of Virginia rivers

References

DeLorme (2005).  Virginia Atlas & Gazetteer.  Yarmouth, Maine: DeLorme.  .

Rivers of Virginia
Tributaries of the James River
Rivers of Albemarle County, Virginia
Rivers of Fluvanna County, Virginia